Kodaikanal Christian College is a private, self-financing, autonomous college in Kodaikanal, Tamil Nadu, India.  Founded on 12 October 1994, KCC is the first arts and science college to be established at Kodaikanal by the House of Abrahams Charitable Trust under the leadership of  Dr. Samuel Abraham.

KCC has been given the University Grants Commission (UGC) recognition status under section 12(b) 2(f) and recognized as a Christian Minority Institution by the Government of India. KCC is an autonomous institute affiliated with Madurai Kamaraj University.

Notable alumni
 Prasanth Alexander, Malayalam Film Actor

References

Christian universities and colleges in India
Education in Dindigul district
Kodaikanal
Educational institutions established in 1994
1994 establishments in Tamil Nadu
Colleges affiliated to Madurai Kamaraj University